(born 8 September 1953), is a Japanese keyboard player, composer and producer. He was the recipient of the 23rd Japan Record Awards arranger award.

History  
Inoue was born in Tokyo. His father was the pioneering Japanese cello player Yoritoro Inoue (井上頼豊).

In the late 1970s, he played in the fusion group PARACHUTE. He released his first of many solo albums in the early 1980s.

He has also composed, arranged, and performed music for several films and OVAs, including SF Shinseiki Lensman, Lily C.A.T., and the Japan/West Germany 1984 film Windy Story.
In the 1990s, he played in The Voice Project and on projects with Masako Kawamura.

He has produced projects for Anri, Mikio Sakai, Yoriko Ganeko, Masako Kawamura, The Voice Project, Kyosuke Himuro, MOON CHILD, Furukawa Ten-sei, Sojiro, harpist Mai Takematsu, Minako Honda and the Yoshida Brothers.

Discography

As solo artist
 Tokyo Installation

As arranger
With Yui Asaka
 C-Girl
 TRUE LOVE
 恋のロックンロール・サーカス
 Chance!
 ボーイフレンドをつくろう
 Self Control

With The Alfee
 讃集詩 ALMIGHTY doubt
 恋人になりたい
 通り雨
 泣かないでMY LOVE
 SUNSET SUMMER
 暁のパラダイス・ロード
 STARSHIP -光を求めて-

With Anri
 Trouble in Paradise

With Ayumi Ishida
 赤いギヤマン
 波になって

With Akina Nakamori
 "Futari Shizuka"

References

External links 
 Official web site
 

1953 births
Japanese composers
Japanese male composers
Japanese male musicians
Living people
Musicians from Tokyo